The 1994 U.S. Senate election in Vermont was held, where incumbent centrist Republican senator Jim Jeffords won re-election to a second term against state senator Jan Backus and independent Gavin Mills. He won every county in the state.

Democratic primary

Candidates 
 Jan Backus, Vermont State Senator
 Douglas M. Costle, former Administrator of the EPA

Results

Republican primary

Candidates 
 Jim Jeffords, incumbent U.S. Senator

Results

Liberty Union primary

Candidates 
 Jerry Levy, sociologist and perennial candidate

Results

General election

Candidates 
 Jan Backus (Democratic), State Senator
 Jim Jeffords (Republican), incumbent U.S. Senator
 Jerry Levy (Liberty Union), sociologist and perennial candidate
 Bob Melamede (Grassroots)
 Gavin Mills (I), former State Chairman of United We Stand America
 Matthew Mulligan (I)
 Joseph Victor Pardo (Natural Law)

Results

See also 
 1994 United States Senate elections

References

External links 

Vermont
1994
1994 Vermont elections